The Haunted Mesa is a 1987 science fiction novel by American writer Louis L'Amour, set in the American Southwest amidst the ruins of the Anasazi.

Plot summary
Mike Raglan, a middle-aged man who specializes in paranormal investigations (and normally debunking the phenomena) has received urgent phone calls and mail from an old friend of his, Erik Hokart. Hokart was an independently wealthy scientist, inventor, and businessman who made his fortune in electronics. He was investigating a mysterious mountainous area in the Southwest, intending to build a secluded home on top of one particular mesa around which rumors had long swirled. His messages to Mike intimated that he was in deep trouble and desperately needed someone of his talents.

Hokart doesn't show up at the designated meeting spot, but the next day Mike receives a package from him, delivered by an exotic female beauty. A man breaks into his room to try to steal the package, and is chased off with an Eric Ambler book and a threat from a .357 Magnum.

The package contains Erik Hokart's journal of his quasi-archaeological expedition. The first night on the chosen mesa, glowing lines appear on the blueprint of a kiva (a room used for religious rituals) attached to the ruins of the house Hokart was using as a makeshift shelter. Hokart is a little perturbed when the glowing lines turn out to be correct, and he begins to excavate the underground kiva even though it looks to have been deliberately buried. It creeps out both him and his large guard dog, "Chief".

Fully excavated, the kiva reveals itself as anomalous in having no sipapu but rather a blind window made out of a curious gray substance. After he finishes, Hokart discovers that a pencil of his had been stolen and replaced with a jar. Afraid, Hokart begins to leave; Chief mistakes his abrupt movements for an intention to attack the kiva and plunges through the window and into a far invisible distance through to an alternate dimension. Erik begins to consider the legends and beliefs of the Hopi: they say their people originally came from the Third World, which was evil, and so they climbed up into a kiva in this, the Fourth World, to escape it; the obvious speculation is that a malign power of the Third World was sealed by the burial of the kiva and that it wants the window to this world opened back up.

Erik rests. His pencil is returned the next day, worn down to a nub. He resharpens it and sets out again. They too vanish, as well as one of his cardigan sweaters. The sweater returns with a newly made twin. Two days later, Chief returns, apparently none the worse for wear.

Having read thus far in Hokart's journal, Mike prepares to travel to the mesa, to personally investigate. He pauses to read further. As Hokart resolved to leave now that his dog had been returned, he is confronted by a striking raven-haired ivory-skinned woman who imperiously orders him to accompany her back through the portal in the kiva. He refuses, struck by a sense of menace and evil radiating from her, and leaves immediately. On the way down, he meets a young girl named Kawasi, who explains that she is a renegade from the Third World and that the woman was a "Poison Woman" who intended to imprison or kill him. They escape, and stop at a restaurant for dinner. He instructs Kawasi to get his journal to Mike, when the restaurant is surrounded by hired thugs. The journal ends with Erik making a break for the jeep and ordering Kawasi out the back.

Mike discovers that the restaurant concerned had been destroyed that night in an abrupt and inexplicable fire. He finds Kawasi waiting for him in another nearby restaurant. She tells him, that night ended in Hokart's kidnapping. They are approached by the local constable, Gallagher. They forthrightly answer his questions and tell him the tale up to that point. Gallagher doesn't quite believe them, but he maintains an open mind.

Raglan determines to go into the Third World (named Shibalba by its inhabitants, who suffer under the decaying and decadent totalitarian regime of "The Hand" and his Lords of Shibalba) to rescue Hokart; the kiva entrance is surely guarded now, so he intends to use a map to Shibalba he was given by an old cowboy who had stolen gold from, and barely escaped alive, the Third World. On his way, he meets "Tazzoc", a historian/archivist of Shibalba's forgotten archives, who tells Raglan much about Shibalba and its rulers; he wants to dissuade Raglan from his quest because it is hopeless and could only lead to trouble.

At the designated place, Raglan is frightened off by the presence of a squad of investigating Shibalban soldiers, "the Varanel, the Night Guards of Shibalba".
Raglan confers with Gallagher and Tazzoc again, who promises to leave some native clothes at the kiva entrance so Raglan can better blend in; Raglan promises to do what he could to save Tazzoc's archives and get them into wider circulation. A confrontation with a local agent of the Hand, Eden Foster, only ends up as a brawl which Raglan wins.

He enters the Third World, enlisting the aid of Johnny (an old cowboy who had been trapped in the Third World for decades) as backup. Raglan rendezvouses with Tazzoc in his archives, located within the mazy trap-filled citadel the Hand lives in and where Hokart is presumably being held, the Forbidden. The archives hold an ancient map from when the Forbidden was first built, and with its aid he finds Hokart's cell – although he is hunted through the Forbidden by the ambitious and arrogant agent Zipacna and his Varanel goons. Raglan's pistols win through the Varanel and rescue the starving Hokart. They break out and Johnny discourages pursuit with his big rifle laying down covering fire on the pursuing Varanel.

A day later, as the portal back to the Fourth World quavers and begins to collapse, they meet Volkmeer, an old friend Raglan had left to guard the kiva who has entered the employ of the Hand, and attempt to escape the Third World.  Raglan, Hokart, and the others escape, but Volkmeer is caught in the portal as it becomes quiescent, and is killed.

See also 
Weird West

References

1987 American novels
Novels by Louis L'Amour
1987 science fiction novels
Western (genre) novels
Southwestern United States in fiction
Works based on folklore
Bantam Books books